I Can Quit Whenever I Want is a 2019 Spanish crime comedy film directed by Carlos Therón starring David Verdaguer, Ernesto Sevilla and Carlos Santos. It is a remake of the 2014 Italian film of the same name.

Plot 
Pedro, Arturo and Eligio are three university lecturers who are fired up from their jobs. Teaming up with Anabel (a lawyer turned gas station employee) and Jota (a wayward student), they find a new niche as producers and sellers of a drug originally developed by Pedro as a vitamin complex as part of a research project.

Cast

Production 
A remake of the 2014 Italian film I Can Quit Whenever I Want, the adapted screenplay was penned by Cristóbal Garrido and Adolfo Valor.  was the director. Other crew members include Claudia Montero (music), Ángel Iguácel (cinematography) and Alberto de Toro (editing). The film is a Telecinco Cinema and MOD Producciones production and it had the participation of Mediaset España and Movistar+. The film was shot in the Summer of 2018 in Madrid.

Release 
Distributed by Sony Pictures Entertainment Iberia, the film was theatrically released in Spain on 12 April 2019. The film was a box office hit in Spain, grossing over 11 million € and 1.8 million ticket sales.

Reception 
Manu Piñón of Fotogramas rated the film with 3 out of 5 stars, considering that all actors know what they are doing.

Javier Ocaña of El País considered the film to be a farce with parodic elements, very well acted, effective in the physical humour and with great punch lines.

Raquel Hernández Luján of HobbyConsolas gave it 60 out of 100 points, deeming it to be an "uneven and somewhat stale comedy", praising the performances of Cristina Castaño, Miren Ibarguren and Ernesto Alterio, while negatively assessing that the lead trio of Verdaguer, Sevilla and Santos are neither charismatic nor funny.

Accolades 

|-
| align = "center" | 2020 || 7th Feroz Awards || colspan = "2" | Best Comedy Film ||  || 
|}

See also 
 List of Spanish films of 2019

References

External links 
 I Can Quit Whenever I Want at ICAA's Catálogo de Cinespañol

Spanish remakes of Italian films
Spanish crime comedy films
2019 comedy films
2010s crime comedy films
Films shot in Madrid
2010s Spanish-language films
Telecinco Cinema films
MOD Producciones films
2010s Spanish films